Cephetola orientalis is a butterfly in the family Lycaenidae. It is found in Cameroon, the Central African Republic, Gabon, the Democratic Republic of the Congo, Uganda, Tanzania north-west and western Kenya. Its habitat consists of primary forests.

References

Butterflies described in 1954
Poritiinae